Bogwangsa is a temple located in Gyeongsangbuk-do, South Korea.

References 

Buddhist temples in South Korea
Cheongsong County
Buildings and structures in North Gyeongsang Province
Buddhist temples of the Jogye Order